Irmgard Riessen is a German film and television actress.

Selected filmography
  (1968, TV film)
 Angels of the Street (1969)
 The Sex Nest (1970)
 Der Sonne entgegen (1985, TV series)
 Jokehnen (1987, TV miniseries)
 Schulz & Schulz (1991–1993, TV series)

External links

1944 births
Living people
German film actresses
German television actresses